Haile Zeru is an Ethiopian Olympic middle-distance runner. He represented his country in the men's 1500 meters at the 1980 Summer Olympics. His time was a 3:45.68.

References 

1955 births
Living people
Ethiopian male middle-distance runners
Olympic athletes of Ethiopia
Athletes (track and field) at the 1980 Summer Olympics